S69 may refer to:
 S69 (Long Island bus)
 County Route S69 (Bergen County, New Jersey)
 Expressway S69 (Poland)
 GER Class S69, a British steam locomotive
 , a submarine of the Royal Navy
 Lincoln Airport (Montana), in Lewis and Clark County, Montana, United States
 Ngarrindjeri language
 Sikorsky S-69, an American experimental helicopter